Pentacora sphacelata is a species of shore bug in the family Saldidae. It is found in the Caribbean Sea, Europe, Northern Asia (excluding China), Central America, North America, and South America.

References

External links

 

Articles created by Qbugbot
Insects described in 1877
Chiloxanthinae